Kuwait competed at the 2008 Summer Olympics in Beijing, China.

Athletics 

Men
Track & road events

Field events

Judo

Shooting 

Men

Swimming 

Men

Table tennis

References 

Nations at the 2008 Summer Olympics
2008
Summer Olympics